A Good Person is a 2023 American drama film written, directed, and produced by Zach Braff. The film stars Florence Pugh, Molly Shannon, Chinaza Uche, Celeste O'Connor, and Morgan Freeman. 

A Good Person is scheduled to be released in the United States on a limited theatrical release on March 24, 2023, before a wide expansion on March 31, 2023, by Metro-Goldwyn-Mayer.

Premise
Years after being involved in a fatal accident, Allison forms an unlikely relationship with her would-be father-in-law.

Cast
 Florence Pugh as Allison
 Morgan Freeman as Daniel
 Molly Shannon as Diane
 Chinaza Uche as Nathan
 Celeste O'Connor as Ryan
 Zoe Lister-Jones as Simone

Production

On February 26, 2021, it was reported Zach Braff would write and direct A Good Person, a drama starring Florence Pugh and Morgan Freeman. By March 2021, Metro-Goldwyn-Mayer (MGM) was in negotiations to acquire the rights to the film in a multimillion-dollar deal. In September 2021, it was confirmed MGM would be producing and distributing the film, with Molly Shannon joining the cast, and Braff and Pugh set to produce.

In July 2021, when asked if he would go back to directing feature films, Braff said "I'd like to do more. I just kind of, for better, for worse, I just go where the wind takes me ... and then the pandemic happened and I wrote this screenplay. And then that came together with Florence [Pugh] and Morgan Freeman". Principal photography began in October 2021, with Celeste O'Connor, Zoe Lister-Jones, and Chinaza Uche joining the cast. In November 2021, filming took place at Columbia High School in Essex County, New Jersey.

Release
It is scheduled to be released on limited release on March 24, 2023, with wide expansion from March 31, 2023. The film had its red carpet premiere at the Ham Yard Hotel in London on March 8, 2023.

References

External links
 Official website
 

2023 drama films
2020s English-language films
American drama films
Films directed by Zach Braff
Films impacted by the COVID-19 pandemic
Films shot in New Jersey
Killer Films films
Metro-Goldwyn-Mayer films
2020s American films